Vasile "Vasilică" Păcuraru (born 11 June 1987) is a Romanian former professional football player who played as a right-back. He played in his career for Farul Constanța, Delta Tulcea and Viitorul Constanța before retiring in 2012, at only 25 years. After retirement Păcuraru started a new career, as the manager of a poker room, in a gambling salon from Constanța. In 2014 Păcuraru returned in football for a short period of time, signing with the Liga V team, Farul Tuzla.

References

External links
 
 
 

1987 births
Living people
Sportspeople from Constanța
Romanian footballers
Association football defenders
Romania under-21 international footballers
Liga I players
Liga II players
FCV Farul Constanța players
FC Delta Dobrogea Tulcea players
FC Viitorul Constanța players